Bishop Grimes Junior/Senior High School is a private, Roman Catholic high school in East Syracuse, New York.  It is located within the Roman Catholic Diocese of Syracuse. This school has more than 350 students in grades seven through twelve.

History
Bishop Grimes Junior/Senior High School was established in 1966.  It is named after the second bishop of Syracuse, John Grimes.
"Originally, the school was staffed by members of the Marist Fathers, priests from the Syracuse Diocese, sisters of Saint Joseph of Carondelet, and by lay teachers.  Today, the school is governed by a Board of Trustees composed of community leaders, alumni, and clergy.  The Board of Trustees, administration, faculty, staff, and coaches are dedicated to carrying out the school’s mission by providing a rigorous, high-quality, Catholic educational experience." The school has had students from almost every public school district in Onondaga County. Plus, they have had kids of each Catholic parish in the Diocese of Syracuse. In 2005, they were in the Top 50 Catholic High Schools in the USA based on academics by the Cardinal Newman Society.

Academics and student life
Bishop Grime has an on-site chapel, monthly Masses, Theology classes, including retreats for each grade. They have 43 JV, modified, and varsity sports teams and two gymnasiums including a field that they can practice on. They offer the opportunity to take either Spanish or French, plus, they can go on tours abroad. They also provide the opportunity to take a band class, a chorus class, and/or drama. The school cooperates with Le Moyne College and offers Advanced Placement Courses. This means that people with high grades on their PSATs can take Le Moyne classes at only a fraction of the price. To assist those with special needs, they have a teacher who is a full-time IEP and a 504-Plan instructor. Financial aid and scholarships are ready with the proper documentation. The Class of 2020 received over $5,000,000 in scholarships, including financial awards. All students that come to Bishop Grimes get a congratulatory iPad for enrolling in the school starting in September 2021. They historically had Chromebooks for quite a few years until 2021.

Graduation requirements
In order to graduate, students need four credits for Theology, four credits for ELA, four credits for Social Studies, four credits for Mathematics, four credits for Science, four credits for a foreign language (Spanish or French; Grimes historically had German and Latin until the 2014-2015 year), one credit for Art/Music, two credits for P.E, 0.5 credits for Health, and 0.5 credits for Electives. In total, students need at least 36 credits to graduate. Students may take honors classes starting in the 8th Grade.

Demographics
As of the 2013–14 school year, the school had an enrollment of 353 students and 28.6 classroom teachers (on an FTE basis), for a student–teacher ratio of 12.3:1. The school's enrollment was 85.3% White, 10.2% Black, 1.1% Hispanic, 2.6% Asian and 0.9% American Indian / Alaska Native.

Notable alumni
Bob Antonacci, NYS Supreme Court Judge, Former NYS Senate Member
Chloe Webb, actress, singer
Tom Kenny, actor and comedian
Bobcat Goldthwait, actor and comedian

Notes and references

External links
 School website

Catholic secondary schools in New York (state)
Educational institutions established in 1966
Roman Catholic Diocese of Syracuse
Schools in Onondaga County, New York
Private middle schools in New York (state)
1966 establishments in New York (state)
DeWitt, New York